"Back to You" is the second solo single by Suede frontman Brett Anderson. It was released in July 2007.

The single was a collaboration with Norwegian electro pop producer Fred Ball (aka Pleasure). It was previously released on the second Pleasure album. The song was previewed by Anderson during his May 2007 concert tour. The version on Anderson's Wilderness album features vocals from French actress Emmanuelle Seigner.

The song became a favourite of Anderson's live shows and it was well-received. Cam Lindsay of Canadian music magazine Exclaim! wrote: "Heartfelt, gorgeous and affecting, it's a shame Brett can't do more of this because this is easily the best thing he's done since 'She's in Fashion' and a memorable moment in 2007." Music Week wrote: "Forever the emotional sound of the suburbs, Brett Anderson's solo work is hardly a million miles from his previous incarnations and this majestic effort sweeps along, pianos, strings and guitars reaching a crescendo reminiscent of many a Suede ballad."

The cover photograph is by Allan Jenkins.

It's also covered by the German band Gregorian feat. Amelia Brightman on their album "Masters of chant Chapter IX",

Track listing
"Back to You"
"Ebony" (Acoustic)
"Infinite Kiss" (Acoustic)
"Love Is Dead" (Acoustic)
"Song for My Father" (Acoustic)

References

2007 singles
Songs written by Brett Anderson
2007 songs
Songs written by Fred Ball (producer)